John de Langley was the member of Parliament for Coventry in 1315.

References 

Members of the Parliament of England for Coventry
English MPs 1315
Year of birth unknown
Year of death unknown